Lycurgus Stoner House, also known as the Edna Brown House, is a historic home located in Washington Township, Putnam County, Indiana. It was built in 1883–1884, and is large -story, vernacular frame dwelling with Italianate and Eastlake movement design elements. It features a hipped roof with gables and projecting bay.

It was listed on the National Register of Historic Places in 1985.

References

Houses on the National Register of Historic Places in Indiana
Italianate architecture in Indiana
Houses completed in 1884
Buildings and structures in Putnam County, Indiana
National Register of Historic Places in Putnam County, Indiana